Khalil Makkawi (born 15 January 1930, in Beirut) is a Lebanese diplomat. He served as Ambassador to the United Kingdom from 1978 to 1983 and as Permanent Representative to the United Nations from 1990 to 1994. He was Vice President of the United Nations General Assembly from 1991 to 1992 and President of the UNICEF Executive Board at the international level in 1995.

References

Ambassadors of Lebanon to the United Kingdom
Chairmen and Presidents of UNICEF
Living people
1930 births
Permanent Representatives of Lebanon to the United Nations
Lebanese diplomats
Lebanese officials of the United Nations